State Route 274 (SR 274), also known as Old Railroad Bed Road, is a  north–south state highway in western Lincoln County, Tennessee.

Route description

SR 274 begins as a continuation of County Road 11 (CR 11) at the Alabama state line. It heads north through farmland to pass through the community of Taft, where it has an intersection with SR 110. The highway then winds its northward through several rural hills and valleys for several miles, where it crosses a bridge over the Elk River, before coming to an end at an intersection with SR 273 between Dellrose and Fayetteville. The entire route of SR 274 is a rural two-lane highway.

Major intersections

References

274
Transportation in Lincoln County, Tennessee